The Hunchback of Notre Dame is a musical play based on the 1831 novel of the same name written by Victor Hugo with songs from the 1996 Walt Disney Animation Studios film adaptation.

The original musical premiered in 1999 in Berlin, Germany as Der Glöckner von Notre Dame ("The Bellringer of Notre Dame"). It was produced by Walt Disney Theatrical, the company's first musical to premiere outside the U.S. It ran for three years, becoming one of Berlin's longest-running musicals.

The English-language musical The Hunchback of Notre Dame, with a revised libretto, had its debut at La Jolla Playhouse in San Diego, California on October 28, 2014 and ran until December 7, 2014. Subsequently, the show went on to open on March 4, 2015 at the Paper Mill Playhouse in Millburn, New Jersey, with more changes in the libretto. The show closed on April 5, 2015, after it was announced that it would not move to Broadway.

In April 2017 a new German production of the musical opened at the Theater des Westens in Berlin. After closing in Berlin, the musical moved to Munich and Stuttgart.

History

Background (1996–1999) 
In 1996, Walt Disney Animation Studios created an animated film adaption of Victor Hugo's novel of the same name. It received generally positive reviews and did reasonably well at the box office. Disney on Broadway, the stage play arm of the Disney Corporation, had staged successful versions of Beauty and the Beast in 1994 and The Lion King in 1997. Disney wanted to move The Lion King to Berlin.

Der Glöckner von Notre Dame (1999–2002)
For a long time, Berlin Theatre (now Theater am Potsdamer Platz) was in talks to stage The Lion King, but after those negotiations fell through, Disney offered The Hunchback of Notre Dame instead. This project, announced by Stella Entertainment on March 18, 1998, saw the stage musical-producing market leader of Germany depart from its tradition of only importing shows which had proven to be successful on Broadway. Originally rehearsed in English, then retaught in German, the musical opened on June 5, 1999 at Berlin.  After a successful run – where 1.4 million visitors saw the play over 1204 performances – it closed in June 2002.

Directed by Lapine, the German translation was by Michael Kunze, choreography by Lar Lubovitch, set design by Heidi Ettinger, costume design by Sue Blane, lighting by Rick Fisher, sound by Tony Meola and projections by Jerome Sirlin. The production cost 45 million marks to produce, much of which was subsidised by state funds. The production featured forty-two actors from six different nations. Nine new songs were written for this version. This was Disney's first musical to premiere outside the US, and it became one of Berlin's longest-running musicals to date. As with Beauty and the Beast and The Lion King, Der Glöckner Von Notre Dame opened three years after the release of the movie on which it is based.

Intermediate period (2002–2013) 
Der Glöckner von Notre Dame was an isolated show, i.e., it only played in one German theatre and was not licensable to other companies. The musical was not staged again in this format for many years, however adaptations of the 1996 film The Hunchback of Notre Dame could be seen in various productions around Disney theme parks and cruises.

In 2008, lyricist Stephen Schwartz revealed, "I think we're starting up Hunchback of Notre Dame, hopefully, next year." In a November 2010 interview, composer Alan Menken confirmed that he was working on an American production, and that they would use James Lapine's book. On January 9, 2013, it was announced that the musical would finally be produced for a Broadway performance with a new book by Peter Parnell and new songs by Menken and Schwartz, who did the songs for the movie and the original musical. In April 2013, the very first English adaptation of Der Glöckner von Notre Dame was staged by the Fine Arts Department of The King's Academy Sports & Fine Arts Center in West Palm Beach, Florida. According to The King's Academy, Walt Disney Productions personally selected them to adapt and premiere the work, and received a license to stage the English version, noting that Disney was workshopping this musical for a possible run on Broadway. The King's Academy collaborated with Disney Executive Studios. Their director, David Snyder, helped Disney cast talent for the new show. This version did not include all the songs from Der Glöckner von Notre Dame, and excludes the deaths of Esmeralda and Frollo. While being an amateur production, it is notable as the first English staging of the musical, rather than a translation of the film.

At the D23 expo, which took place on August 9–11, 2013, Josh Strickland performed the first official English version of a new song written for the stage musical version, Made of Stone.

The Hunchback of Notre Dame (2014–present) 
The Hunchback of Notre Dame had a workshop in February 2014, and its North American premiere at La Jolla Playhouse on October 28, 2014 and ran through December 7, 2014, directed by Scott Schwartz. The production featured Sacra-Profana, a local 32-voice chorus, appearing onstage during the entire show. The La Jolla Playhouse production transferred to the Paper Mill Playhouse with the 19 person core cast with three new cast members Jeremy Stolle, Dashaun Young, and Joseph J. Simeone, (replacing San Diego locals Brian Smolin, William Thomas Hodgson, and Lucas Coleman respectively) with a new choir local to New Jersey, the Continuo Arts Symphonic Chorus from March 4 through April 5, 2015, after which it was announced the show would not move to Broadway, but it was never officially planned to transfer. The structure of the show was finalized (with one song, Agnus Dei being cut from the show) and turned into a licensable work.

2016–17 saw the first wave of US regional theatres to produce the musical; one theatre (Music Theatre Wichita) received a $10,000 grant from the National Endowment for the Arts to financially aid the production. In December 2017 the show finally got its New York debut with its NY Regional Premiere at the White Plains Performing Arts Center and opened to outstanding reviews.

An adaption of the musical, debuted in 2016 at the Music Circus in Sacramento, embraced the novel's assertion that Quasimodo had become deaf after constantly ringing bells all his life by incorporating sign language into the show. Deaf actor John McGinty was cast as Quasimodo, with a surrogate singer (one of the Notre Dame saints, played by Jim Hogan) singing Quasimodo's songs while McGinty signed.

A Japanese cast opened in 2016 at the Shiki Theatre Company which is one of the largest theatres in all of Japan. The production opened in 2016 and released their cast album in 2017. Unlike the 1999 German cast, This production is a direct translation of the current revision of the Disney production translated into Japanese. No songs or scenes have been changed outside of translation 

A production featured an intimate rotating cast of 18 (with no additional choir), and reduced orchestrations with the cast playing their own instruments. The production was directed by Nicholas Wainwright at The University Of The Arts in December 2017; making its Center City premiere in Philadelphia.

Another production was a staging done outdoors in the amphitheater at Tuacahn Center for the Arts, which was performed from August 5-October 15, 2016.

The show was performed for the first time in the UK at The Royal Welsh College of Music and Drama by the Richard Burton Company in June 2019, directed by Graham Gill.

The National Youth Music Theatre (NYMT) staged the first production of the show in England in Manchester Cathedral in 2021.

Due to union restrictions regarding the inclusion of the choir and the profitability for Disney from licensing to local productions, the musical has never been staged on Broadway, which has garnered some criticism.

Plot 

Act One

In 1482 Paris, Clopin, an elderly gypsy beggar, narrates the origin of the titular hunchback ("Die Glocken Notre Dames" – "The Bells of Notre Dame"). The story begins as a group of gypsies sneak illegally into Paris, but are ambushed by Judge Claude Frollo, the Minister of Justice of Paris, and his soldiers. A gypsy woman in the group attempts to flee with her deformed baby, but Frollo chases and kills her outside Notre Dame. He tries to kill the baby as well, but the cathedral's archdeacon intervenes and accuses Frollo of murdering an innocent woman. To atone for his sin, Frollo reluctantly agrees to raise the deformed child in Notre Dame as his son, naming him Quasimodo.

Twenty years later, in 1502, Quasimodo develops into a kind yet isolated young man who dreams of seeing life outside the bell tower. Due to his loneliness,  Quasimodo's mind created imaginary friends: a trio of gargoyles named Charles, Antoine and Loni. Despite Frollo's warnings that he would be shunned for his deformity, the gargoyles urge him to disobey Frollo, ("Zuflucht" – "Sanctuary") and Quasimodo decides to go out for just one day ("Draußen" – "Out There").

While the Parisians continue their preparations for a festival, the gypsies prepare to attend the festival in their hideout, the Court of Miracles ("Tanz auf dem Seil" – "Balancing Act"). Their attention is taken by a newcomer, a young gypsy dancer named Esmeralda. Meanwhile, Phoebus of Frollo's guard arrives in Paris excited about his new promotion as its captain ("Ein bisschen Freude" – "Rest and Recreation"). He flirts with a young girl but is suddenly interrupted by a fleeing gypsy accused of theft. The gypsy pleads innocence, but Frollo arrives and orders his soldiers to arrest the gypsy. Frollo tells Phoebus that the city has become overrun by gypsies and that he plans to find the Court of Miracles and eliminate them all.

As the festival begins ("Drunter drüber" – "Topsy Turvy"), Quasimodo attends it and he is celebrated for his bizarre appearance, only to be humiliated by the crowd after Frollo's men start a riot. Frollo refuses to help Quasimodo, but Esmeralda intervenes, frees the hunchback, and uses a magic trick to disappear. Frollo confronts Quasimodo and sends him back inside the cathedral.

Phoebus refuses to arrest Esmeralda for alleged witchcraft inside Notre Dame and has her confined to the cathedral. Esmeralda, encouraged by the Archdeacon, offers a prayer to God to help her and the other outcasts ("Hilf den Verstoß'nen" – "God Help the Outcasts"). Meanwhile, Frollo orders Phoebus to post a guard at every door to ensure that Esmeralda does not escape.

Esmeralda finds and befriends Quasimodo to the bell tower and is captivated by the view of the city ("Hoch über der Welt" – "On Top of the World"). Quasimodo helps her escape Notre Dame out of gratitude for defending him. Esmeralda entrusts Quasimodo with a pendant containing a map to the Court of Miracles. Quasimodo expresses his feelings, as he has been touched by Esmeralda's kindness ("Das Licht des Himmels" – "Heaven's Light"). Meanwhile, Frollo soon develops lustful feelings for Esmeralda and, upon realizing them, he begs the Virgin Mary to save him from her "spell" to avoid eternal damnation ("Das Feuer der Hölle" – "Hellfire").

After discovering that Esmeralda escaped, Frollo instigates a citywide manhunt for her, which involves setting fire to countless houses in his way. Phoebus is appalled by Frollo's evil reputation and defies him. Frollo sentences him to death. Phoebus is briefly struck by an arrow and falls into the Seine but Esmeralda rescues him. ("Finale Act 1"/"Esmeralda").

Act Two

The soldiers continue searching the city ("Trommeln in der Stadt" – "City Under Siege"). Esmeralda tells Phoebus to seek refuge at Notre Dame while she returns to the Court of Miracles. Meanwhile, the gargoyles convince Quasimodo that Esmeralda finds him romantically intriguing, and they reassure him about her safety ("Ein Mann wie du" – "A Guy Like You"). The Archdeacon brings Phoebus to the bell tower and Phoebus, knowing Quasimodo to be a friend of Esmeralda's, asks Quasimodo to hide him.

Frollo returns to Notre Dame later that night and discovers that Quasimodo helped Esmeralda escape. He bluffs to Quasimodo, saying that he knows about the Court of Miracles and that he intends to attack at dawn. After Frollo leaves, Phoebus comes out of hiding and asks Quasimodo to help him find the Court of Miracles and warn Esmeralda. Quasimodo refuses to leave the cathedral again, but Phoebus and the gargoyles teach Quasimodo the value of devotion and selflessness ("Weil du liebst" – "Out of Love").

Using Esmeralda's amulet as their guide, Quasimodo and Phoebus find the Court of Miracles to warn the gypsies. Esmeralda and Phoebus decide to leave the city together while Quasimodo, heartbroken, watches Esmeralda leave with the man she truly loves ("Weil du liebst" – "Out of Love" (Reprise)). However, Frollo, having followed the two, captures the gypsies present.

Esmeralda rejects Frollo's advances of becoming his mistress. Tied up in the bell tower, Quasimodo refuses to help and tells the gargoyles to leave him ("Wie aus Stein" – "Made of Stone"). As dawn approaches, Esmeralda awaits her execution in the dungeon with Phoebus, hoping that one day the world will be a better place ("Einmal" – "Someday").

Frollo prepares to burn Esmeralda at the stake, but Quasimodo rescues her and brings her to the cathedral. Phoebus then frees himself and the gypsies and rallies the citizens of Paris against Frollo and his men, who attempt to break into the cathedral. Quasimodo calls upon the saints and the gargoyles before pouring molten lead onto the streets to ensure no one enters, but Frollo himself successfully breaks in. In the cathedral, Esmeralda thanks Quasimodo for being a good friend and dies from smoke inhalation. Frollo arrives and, after asking Quasimodo if she is dead, tells the hunchback that they are finally free of her poison. Encouraged by Antoine, Quasimodo throws Frollo to his death in the molten lead. The gargoyles comfort Quasimodo and tell him the world is full of good as well as evil. The citizens watch as Quasimodo carries Esmeralda's body through the square with Phoebus by his side. Clopin appears again and asks what makes a monster and what makes a man ("Finale Ultimo" – "Grand Finale").

Act One

Many years ago, orphaned brothers Jehan and Claude Frollo were taken in at Notre Dame. Jehan grew to be mischievous while Claude remained pious. After Jehan was caught with a gypsy woman, he was expelled from Notre Dame. Frollo eventually became the archdeacon of Notre Dame. One day, Frollo received a letter from Jehan; the two met in secret, where Jehan, on his deathbed, gave Frollo his deformed baby before dying. As Frollo prepared to kill the child, he suddenly felt as he was being tested by God. Thus, he instead saved the child, naming it Quasimodo, or "half-formed", and raising it in Notre Dame ("The Bells of Notre Dame").

In the present day (in the year 1542), Quasimodo is now a young man, made partially deaf by a lifetime of ringing Notre Dame's bells. He talks to Notre Dame's statues of saints and gargoyles about his desire to go to the Feast of Fools. Frollo arrives and asks him who he is speaking to, reminding him that the stone statues cannot talk. They recite the biblical story of the Flight into Egypt, after which Frollo complains about Paris's gypsies and the Feast of Fools ("Sanctuary Part I"). Quasimodo offers to protect him outside; Frollo declines, warning him that he would be shunned if he were to go out in public ("Sanctuary Part II"). Quasimodo sings to himself, yearning to spend one day outside Notre Dame ("Out There").

In the streets of Paris, the Feast of Fools begins, led by Clopin, the gypsy king ("Topsy Turvy Part I"). Meanwhile, Captain Phoebus, the new head of Notre Dame's Cathedral Guard, arrives in Paris from the front lines. Frollo welcomes him, telling him they must rid the city of gypsies ("Rest and Recreation"). Clopin introduces Esmeralda, a gypsy dancer ("Rhythm of the Tambourine")—Quasimodo, Frollo, and Phoebus are all entranced by her. After that, Clopin holds a contest to crown the King of Fools, the ugliest person in Paris. Encouraged by Esmeralda, Quasimodo enters, immediately winning the contest ("Topsy Turvy Part II") before being humiliated by the crowd. Esmeralda rescues Quasimodo with a magic trick before Frollo intervenes. He scolds Quasimodo; the two return to Notre Dame, followed by Esmeralda ("Sanctuary Part III").

Frollo finds Esmeralda, confronting her; after a brief argument, he relents, allowing her to stay. Esmeralda prays to God to help the less fortunate ("God Help the Outcasts"). Phoebus finds Esmeralda; they argue, Phoebus telling her not to fight unwinnable battles, to which she retorts that she cannot help it.

Esmeralda heads to the bell tower, finding Quasimodo there. The two quickly befriend each other ("Top of the World"), Quasimodo ringing the bells of Notre Dame for her. Frollo runs up to the tower, angry at Quasimodo for ringing the bells at the wrong time. He is shocked by Esmeralda's presence, thinking she had left. He offers her shelter so he may save her soul, but she rejects his offer, saying that she sees the way Frollo looks at her. This infuriates Frollo, who orders Phoebus to escort her from Notre Dame and arrest her if she sets foot in it again. Frollo warns Quasimodo that Esmeralda is a dangerous person sent from Hell and to ignore any lustful feelings he may feel towards her. Yet, having developed such feelings for Esmeralda himself, Frollo roams the streets nightly, one night discovering Esmeralda, Clopin and multiple other gypsies partying with Phoebus; he is unable to look away as Esmeralda dances and kisses Phoebus ("Tavern Song (Thai Mol Piyas)"). Meanwhile, in the bell tower, Quasimodo reflects on seeing couples in love from his tower and how he never thought himself worthy of love until meeting Esmeralda ("Heaven's Light").

Frollo prays, begging the Virgin Mary to save him by either condemning Esmeralda to Hell or giving her to him ("Hellfire"). The next day, he approaches King Louis XI asking for special powers to stop a 'gypsy witch' to protect Paris, which he is granted. With his new powers, he instigates a citywide manhunt for Esmeralda which leads him to a brothel known for hiding gypsies. When the brothel's owner claims ignorance, Frollo orders Phoebus to burn the brothel down, an order which Phoebus defies. As Frollo orders Phoebus's arrest, Esmeralda appears; a fight breaks loose. Amidst the commotion, Frollo stabs Phoebus and frames Esmeralda for it; she uses a magic trick to escape. Frollo continues the hunt, while Quasimodo grows increasingly worried about Esmeralda's whereabouts ("Esmeralda").

Act Two

Esmeralda returns to Notre Dame, asking Quasimodo to hide the injured Phoebus. She gives Quasimodo a woven band and leaves. Inspired by the story of Saint Aphrodisius and encouraged by the saints, Quasimodo deciphers the woven band as a map and resolves to help her ("Flight into Egypt"). Frollo returns to Notre Dame, asking Quasimodo where Esmeralda is; Quasimodo responds that he doesn't know. Frollo appears to accept this, before a guard informs Frollo that they know where Esmeralda is. Frollo tells Quasimodo that they will now be successful in capturing Esmeralda and leaves ("Esmeralda (Reprise)").

Using the map, Quasimodo and Phoebus go to warn the gypsies ("Rest and Recreation (Reprise)"). Initially, the gypsies attempt to kill the two, but they are saved by Esmeralda. ("Court of Miracles"). The two tell the gypsies Frollo will attack at dawn. The gypsies prepare to leave; Phoebus asks Esmeralda to go with her, the two expressing their love for each other as Quasimodo looks on, heartbroken ("Heaven's Light (Reprise)/In a Place of Miracles"). Frollo suddenly enters, having followed Quasimodo, and arrests all present—only Clopin manages to escape. Frollo has the guards lock Quasimodo in the bell tower.

Frollo visits Esmeralda, telling her that he can save her if she accepts being with him. When Esmeralda refuses, he threatens Phoebus' life and attempts to rape her ("Sanctuary (Reprise)"). He halts when Esmeralda cries out in protest, allowing her to have a final conversation with Phoebus. Phoebus pleads for her to accept Frollo's offer to save herself, which Esmeralda refuses to do. They yearn together for a better future ("Someday"). Meanwhile, in the bell tower, the statues encourage Quasimodo to free himself and save Esmeralda; Quasimodo angrily denounces them, declaring that he will remain stoic until he dies ("Made of Stone").

At dawn, Esmeralda is tied to a pyre outside Notre Dame. Frollo sentences her to death, offering her one last chance to save herself, which she angrily rejects. He orders her pyre to be lit. Quasimodo swings down on a rope from the bell tower and takes Esmeralda back to Notre Dame, invoking Notre Dame's status as a sanctuary in an appeal for protection. Frollo orders the Cathedral Guard to retake the church by force. Clopin frees Phoebus, after which the two rally the people of Paris to fight against the guards. However, the guards still manage to break in. Quasimodo dumps the molten lead used for fixing the bells onto the guards to stop them. Esmeralda thanks Quasimodo for being a good friend before dying from smoke inhalation. Frollo enters and asks Quasimodo if she is dead, which he broken-heartedly confirms. Relieved, Frollo tells Quasimodo that they are finally free of her poison. Quasimodo angrily throws Frollo off the tower of Notre Dame to his death.

Devastated, Quasimodo realizes that everyone he has ever loved is now dead. Phoebus arrives, finding out about Esmeralda's death. Phoebus tries to carry her body away but is unable to due to his injuries. Quasimodo then carries Esmeralda away.

Years later, two skeletons are discovered in the crypts of Notre Dame, one holding the other in its arms – the former has a woven band around its neck and the other has a crooked spinal column. When it was attempted to detach the two, the latter crumbles to dust. The company finally addresses the audience with a question asked at the beginning of the show—"What makes a monster and what makes a man?" ("Finale").

Music 

Songlist

 Act I
"Die Glocken Notre Dames" ("The Bells of Notre Dame") – Clopin, Archdeacon, Frollo, Chorus
"Zuflucht" ("Sanctuary") – Frollo, Quasimodo, Charles, Loni, Antoine
"Draußen" ("Out There") – Quasimodo
"Schneller, Schneller" ("Hurry, Hurry") – Gypsies
"Tanz auf dem Seil" ("Balancing Act") – Clopin, Esmeralda, Gypsies
"Schneller, Schneller II" ("Hurry, Hurry II") – Gypsies
"Ein bißchen Freude" ("Rest and Recreation") – Phoebus
"Schneller, Schneller III" ("Hurry, Hurry III") – Gypsies, Frollo
"Drunter drüber" ("Topsy Turvy") – Clopin, Quasimodo, Crowd
"Der Pilory" ("The Pillory") – Crowd
"Zuflucht II" ("Sanctuary II") – Frollo, Quasimodo
"Die Glocken Notre Dames II" ("The Bells of Notre Dame II") – Clopin, Priests
"Hilf den Verstoß'nen" ("God Help the Outcasts") – Esmeralda, Quasimodo, Parisians
"Hoch über der Welt" ("Top of the World") – Esmeralda, Quasimodo, Charles, Loni, Antoine
"Vor Das Licht des Himmels" ("Before Heaven's Light") – Clopin, Esmeralda
"Das Licht des Himmels" ("Heaven's Light") – Quasimodo
"Das Feuer der Hölle" ("Hellfire") – Frollo, Priests
"Die Glocken Notre Dames III" ("The Bells of Notre Dame III") – Clopin, Frollo
"Finale Act 1" – Clopin, Chorus
"Esmeralda" – Frollo, Quasimodo, Phoebus, Esmeralda, Clopin, Soldiers

 Act II
"Trommeln in der Stadt" ("City Under Siege") – Clopin, Parisians
"Ein Mann wie du" ("A Guy Like You") – Charles, Loni, Antoine, Quasimodo
"Esmeralda (Reprise)" – Frollo
"Weil du liebst" ("Out of Love") – Quasimodo, Phoebus, Antoine, Charles, Loni
"Tanz der Zigeuner" ("Dance of the Gypsies") (instrumental)
"Weil du liebst reprise"  ("Out of Love reprise") – Phoebus, Esmeralda, Quasimodo
"Die Glocken Notre Dames IV" ("The Bells of Notre Dame IV") – Clopin, Frollo
"Zuflucht reprise" ("Sanctuary reprise") – Frollo
"Wie aus Stein" ("Made of Stone") – Quasimodo, Loni, Charles, Antoine
"Einmal" ("Someday") – Esmeralda, Phoebus, Parisians
"Finale Ultimo" ("Grand Finale") – Full Company

An original cast recording was recorded in German.

Instrumentation

 Reed I (Flute, Piccolo)
 Reed II (Oboe, English Horn)
 Reed III (Clarinet, Alto Saxophone, Flute, Electronic Wind Instrument)
 Reed IV (Clarinet, Bass Clarinet, Tenor Saxophone, Oboe, English Horn)
 Reed V (Clarinet, Baritone Saxophone, Bassoon)
 2 Trumpets
 2 Horns
 1 Trombone/Euphonium
 1 Bass Trombone/Tuba
 2 Percussion
 3 Keyboards
 4 Violins
 1 Viola
 1 Cello
 1 Contrabass

 

Songlist

Act I
"Olim" – Congregation
"The Bells of Notre Dame" –Clopin,  Frollo, Jehan, Father Dupin, Quasimodo, Congregation
"Sanctuary"  – Frollo, Quasimodo
"Out There" – Quasimodo
"Topsy Turvy (Part 1)" – Clopin, Quasimodo, Gypsies, Congregation
"Rest and Recreation" – Phoebus, Soldiers, Frollo
"Rhythm of the Tambourine" – Esmeralda, Clopin, Phoebus, Frollo, Quasimodo
"Topsy Turvy (Part 2)" – Clopin, Congregation
"Sanctuary II"  – Frollo, Quasimodo
"The Bells of Notre Dame (Reprise)"  − Esmeralda, Congregation
"God Help the Outcasts" – Esmeralda, Congregation
"Top of the World" – Esmeralda, Quasimodo, Statues, Gargoyles
"The Tavern Song" (Thai Mol Piyas)" – Esmeralda, Frollo, Clopin, Gypsies
"Heaven's Light" – Quasimodo
"Hellfire" – Frollo, Congregation
"Esmeralda" –Official, Frollo, Phoebus, Madame, Quasimodo, Soldiers, Congregation

Act II
"Entr'acte" – Congregation
"Flight Into Egypt" – Saint Aphrodisius, Quasimodo, Statues, Gargoyles
"Esmeralda (Reprise)"  – Frollo
"Rest and Recreation (Reprise)"  – Phoebus, Quasimodo
"The Court of Miracles" – Clopin, Gypsies
"In a Place of Miracles" – Phoebus, Esmeralda, Quasimodo, Clopin, Gypsies
"The Bells of Notre Dame (Reprise II)"  – Congregation
"Someday" – Esmeralda, Phoebus
"While the City Slumbered" – Congregation
"Made of Stone" – Quasimodo, Statues, Gargoyles
"Judex Crederis"  − Congregation
"Kyrie Eleison"  − Frollo, Phoebus, Quasimodo, Congregation
"Top of the World (Reprise)"  − Esmeralda
"Esmeralda (Frollo Reprise)"  − Frollo, Congregation
"Finale Ultimo"  – Frollo, Quasimodo, Florika, Clopin, Congregation

Notes
 Included as part of "Out There" on Studio Cast Recording
Combined on Studio Cast Recording into one song titled "Into Notre Dame"
Not present on Studio Cast Recording
Titled "Justice in Paris" on Studio Cast Recording
Combined on Studio Cast Recording into one song titled "Finale"
Many changes were made to the score when the production transferred from San Diego to Millburn, including cutting the song "In My Life," sung following "God Help the Outcasts" by Esmeralda and Phoebus

Instrumentation

 Reed I (Flute, Piccolo, Soprano Saxophone, Clarinet)
 Reed II (Oboe, English Horn, Clarinet, Alto Saxophone)
 Reed III (Bassoon, Baritone Saxophone, Bass Clarinet, Clarinet)
 1 Piccolo Trumpet/Trumpet
 1 Trumpet/Flugelhorn
 1 Horn
 1 Bass Trombone/Euphonium/Tenor Trombone
 1 Drums/Percussion
 2 Keyboards
 2 Violins
 1 Viola
 1 Cello

 Design and themes 

Alan Menken noted that "some songs complement the original composition of the film" while "others are very different from the film compositions and extend the musical spectrum", making a special mention of a song in Act II which was inspired by traditional Roma music. Translator Michael Kunze "campaign[ed] to allow Esmeralda to die at the end, as she does in the book. There was a feeling that the audience would be depressed if Esmeralda dies. I feel that a European audience would see this as a very romantic ending ... two lost souls finally find each other. People will cry, but they'll be moved." The producers wanted to see how preview audiences reacted before making the final decision. The set for the production utilized many large hydraulically controlled boxes that can be placed at any height, onto which projections were used in every scene for scenery and effects. The finale of act one shows Phoebus' plummet from a bridge over the Seine after being shot by an arrow.

 

The style of the show is a "Victor Hugo adaption with the score of Disney's Hunchback." "The Bells of Notre Dame" is rewritten to include Frollo's past as a priest as well as his relationship with his brother Jehan before becoming the cathedral's archdeacon. The gargoyles, Victor, Hugo, and Laverne (Charles, Antoine, and Loni in the Berlin production), who are the comic relief in the 1996 movie, are cut. Quasimodo speaks with a "strangled slur", rather than his pure voice in the movie. He relies on a form of sign language that he has invented, and while he is unable to articulate, the statues of Notre Dame serve as figments of his imagination, which provide insight into his thoughts and attitudes as a Greek chorus. Some of the original characters from the novel are added, as well as songs such as "The Tavern Song", "Rhythm of the Tambourine," "Flight into Egypt" and "In a Place of Miracles." The musical relies on a series of musical leitmotifs, which are reprised either instrumentally or vocally. Each of the central characters has a theme ("Out There" for Quasimodo, "God Help the Outcasts" for Esmeralda, "Hellfire" for Frollo, and "Rest and Recreation" for Phoebus). "The Bells of Notre Dame" acts as a narrative device to tell parts of the story.  Thomas Schumacher, president of the Walt Disney Theatrical, noted that the English adaption of the musical embraced the darker elements of the original source material by Victor Hugo. After Michael Arden, who played the role of Quasimodo in this version, read the book and discovered that Quasimodo is actually deaf from bell-ringing, he incorporated this aspect into his character, including a sign language-based form of communication. He had to selectively choose the moments to forgo the ailment in order to sing, such as moments when Quasimodo is alone; from his perspective he does not see his deformities. Michael Arden said of his part that he would retire from the role in future incarnations of the show. The ending was proposed by director Scott Schwartz, who turned to the original source material for inspiration; it was inserted during tech rehearsals for the Papermill staging. According to Thomas W. Douglas, musical director of a 2017 adaption at MTW, the musical may leave the audience feeling thoughtful and pensive, rather than compelling them to stand up and cheer, due to the story's moral ambiguity and complexity. The theme of the play, according to Kyoto Quasimodo actor , is of how to behave when in contact with others different from ourselves. Alan Menken and Stephen Schwartz felt that having a live choir on stage was integral in achieving the full-bodied sound they had crafted for the film; in addition James Lapine gave them his blessing in tinkering with his book for the new production.

 

The First Japanese production worked to closely replicate the set design and choreography of the original American production. The script received no significant changes outside of translation and keeps all music within the original score.

 Critical reception 

Matt Wolf of Variety said, "The prevailing tone, indeed, is far and away the most somber of the three Disney film-to-stage shows yet." He wrote that "the design is likely to be the show's talking point in any language, coupling as it does the best of British and American talent with a new $100 million dollar-plus playhouse specifically adapted to accommodate the demands of the piece. The aquamarine stage curtain, Gothic tracery already encoded within it, rises to reveal set designer Heidi Ettinger's ever-shifting array of cubes that join with Jerome Sirlin's projections to conjure the medieval world of the Parisian belltower inhabited by Sarich's misshapen orphan Quasimodo, his unyielding master Frollo (Norbert Lamla) and a trio of very chatty gargoyles."

Awards and nominations

|-
| November 1999
| Der Glöckner von Notre Dame| Goldenen Europa (Golden Europe) award for Best Musical of the Year
| 
|-
| January 2000
| Der Glöckner von Notre Dame| B.Z.-Kulturpreis (B.Z. Culture Prize) for Best Stage Design
| 

The English version of the musical received positive reviews. The New York Daily News wrote, "This stage musical smartly excises comic relief from the film's giggling gargoyles...The look of the show is also very good. Alexander Dodge's lavish bell-tower, Alejo Vietti's gritty period costumes and Howell Binkley's dynamic lights lend to the atmosphere." The New York Times deemed it a "surprising[ly] self-serious...polished but ponderous musical" with a "simultaneously impressive and oppressive" stage and "rich choral singing." The Hollywood Reporter said "Menken's uncommonly complex, classically-influenced score often soars." AM New York called the musical "an unusually dark and chilling piece of musical theater which explores physical deformity, religious extremism, sexual repression and even genocide."

Awards and nominations

|-
| 2014
| The Hunchback of Notre Dame| San Diego Theatre Critics Circle Craig Noel Award for Outstanding Resident Musical
| 
|-
| 2014
| Brent Alan Huffman
| San Diego Theatre Critics Circle Craig Noel Award for Outstanding Musical Direction
| 
|-
| 2014
|  Patrick Page
| San Diego Theatre Critics Circle Craig Noel Award for Outstanding Featured Male Performance in a Musical
| 
|-
| 2014
| Howell Binkley
| San Diego Theatre Critics Circle Craig Noel Award for Outstanding Lighting Design
| 
|-
| 2014
| Alexander Dodge
| San Diego Theatre Critics Circle Craig Noel Award for Outstanding Scenic Design
| 
|-
| 2014
|  Scott Schwartz
| San Diego Theatre Critics Circle Craig Noel Award for Outstanding Direction of a Musical
| 
|-
| 2018
| Best Musical – Stampede Troupe
| Broadway World Denver Award for Best Musical
| 
|-
| 2018
| John Sosna – Stampede Troupe
| Broadway World Denver Award for Best Actor in a Musical
| 
|-
| 2018
| Hannah Marie Harmon – Stampede Troupe
| Broadway World Denver Award for Best Actress in a Musical
| 
|-
| 2018
| Ken W Andrews – Stampede Troupe
| Broadway World Denver Award for Best Supporting Actor in a Musical
| 
|-
| 2018
| Barb Gilliam – Stampede Troupe
| Broadway World Denver Award for Best Costume Design of a Musical
| 
|-
| 2018
| Peter F. Muller – Stampede Troupe
| Broadway World Denver Award for Best Director of a Musical
| 
|-
| 2018
| Nicole Harwell – Stampede Troupe
| Broadway World Denver Award for Best Music Director  
| 
|-
| 2018
| Scot Gagnon / Peter F Muller – Stampede Troupe
| Broadway World Denver Award for Best Set Design of a Musical  
| 
|-
| 2017
| The Hunchback of Notre Dame – Aurora Theatre and Theatrical Outfit
| BroadwayWorld Atlanta Award for Best Musical (Professional)
| 
|-
| 2017
| Haden Rider – Aurora Theatre and Theatrical Outfit
| BroadwayWorld Atlanta Award for Best Actor in a Musical (Professional)
| 
|-
| 2018
| Eric Collins
| Kelsey Award for Outstanding Sound Design
| 
|-
| 2018
| Vicki Kaiser
| Kelsey Award for Outstanding Lighting Design
| 
|-
| 2018
| Sally Page & Koren Zander 
| Kelsey Award for Outstanding Costume and Makeup
| 
|-
| 2018
| Bryan Schendlinger
| Kelsey Award for Outstanding Scenic Design
| 
|-
| 2018
| Vianna Fagel 
| Kelsey Award for Outstanding Stage Management
| 
|-
| 2018
| Shannon Ferrara & Michael Gilch 
| Kelsey Award for Outstanding Musical Direction
| 
|-
| 2018
| Rachel Tovar 
| Kelsey Award for Outstanding Choreography
| 
|-
| 2018
| Frank Ferrara 
| Kelsey Award for Outstanding Direction of a Musical
| 
|-
| 2018
| Alicia Rose Dishon as "Esmeralda"
| Kelsey Award for Outstanding Debut Performance
| 
|-
| 2018
| CJ Carter as "Quasimodo" 
| Kelsey Award for Outstanding Debut Performance
| 
|-
| 2018
| Alicia Rose Dishon as "Esmeralda" 
| Kelsey Award for Outstanding Lead Actress in a Musical
| 
|-
| 2018
| CJ Carter as "Quasimodo"
| Kelsey Award for Outstanding Lead Actor in a Musical
| 
|-
| 2018
| The Hunchback of Notre Dame – The Pennington Players
| Kelsey Award for Outstanding Production of a Musical
| 
|-

Additionally, Hunchback received 10 Tommy Tune awards from 15 nominations, 6 Kennt Award nominations, 13 Blue Star Award nominations, 10 Tune Awards, 15 Freedy Award nominations and 8 wins, 6 Blumey Award nominations, one  Annual Pierrot Award, and 7 TBA awards. The Danish version received 3 award nominations.

Principal cast

 Cast albums 

 German (1999) 
A German cast album was recorded in 1999.

 English (2015) 
On May 15, 2015, it was announced that the Paper Mill cast would be releasing a cast recording of the show. Recorded on September 28–30 at Avatar Studios,"Michael Arden, Patrick Page, and More Record Hunchback of Notre Dame Cast Album". theatermania.com. the album features a 25-piece orchestra, with a 32-strong choir. The recording was released by Ghostlight Records in January 2016. The cast album was released to critical and commercial acclaim. It debuted at number one on Billboard's Cast Albums chart upon its release, thereby ending the 17-week run of Hamilton'' on this list.

German (2017) 
A German cast album was recorded in 2017. M1 Musical wrote that from the first notes of Olim in the German recording, the reviewer was given goosebumps; they ultimately deemed it a "masterpiece – the diamond in the CD shelf."

See also

References

External links 
Official Der Glöckner von Notre Dame website (in German) (Current 2018 Stuttgart Production)
 Official Der Glöckner von Notre Dame website (Archive)
 Official Der Glöckner von Notre Dame website  (Archive)
 Description of the technical design of the original production 
 Character Portraits for The Hunchback of Notre Dame by danscape, Texas Premiere at The Playhouse San Antonio

1999 musicals
Musicals based on animated films
Musicals based on multiple works
Musicals based on novels
Disney Theatrical Productions musicals
The Hunchback of Notre Dame (franchise)
Musicals by Alan Menken
Musicals by James Lapine
Musicals by Stephen Schwartz
Plays set in the 15th century
Plays set in France